Mucilaginibacter vulcanisilvae is an exopolysaccharide-producing and non-motile bacterium from the genus of Mucilaginibacter which has been isolated from the volcanic forest of the Jeju Island in Korea.

References

Sphingobacteriia
Bacteria described in 2015